Iana Matei is a Romanian activist and founder of Reaching Out Romania, an organization to seek out and rehabilitate victims of forced prostitution.

Early life
Iana Matei was born in Orăștie, Romania. Her mother was a pentathlete, and her father was a football coach. When Matei was three years old, her family moved to Bucharest due to her father's work, then later moved to the industrial city of Pitești.

Matei speaks four languages, her native Romanian, Serbian, English, and French. The two married and had Matei's first son, Ștefan. Matei later divorced Dmitri due to domestic violence, abuse, and alcohol abuse issues. 

Matei lived during the period of the Soviet occupation of Romania. In 1989, at the start of the Romanian Revolution, Matei participated in riots and other protest activities against the Communist government. After an incident where Matei lost her handbag with her identity documents during a protest in University Square, she believed it was no longer safe to stay in the country and fled. She left her son with her mother and illegally travelled to Serbia, where she was captured and sentenced to twenty days of imprisonment. During her confinement, Matei went on a hunger strike, insisting that a representative of the United Nations High Commissioner for Refugees (UNHCR) visit her and acknowledge her presence. After her sentence was completed, Matei was relocated to a Serbian refugee camp, where she was hired as a translator for UNHCP. Matei's son reunited with her from Romania, and the two moved to Australia and have become involved with humanitarian work.

On January 20, 2010, Matei was named "European of the Year" by Reader's Digest. Iana Matei's book was first published in 2010 by OH! Editions in France under the title "A vendre, Mariana, 15 ans".

Humanitarian work
Matei was studying psychology for a diploma. The topic she chose to study for her work was homeless children. Matei interviewed children she found in the streets of Australia. At first, out of pity, she gave them a few sandwiches, but on her subsequent visit, she brought pasta and fed about fifteen people. This continued for a few months and extended beyond field research. In 1994, Matei founded "Reaching Out", an organization that helps street kids in Australia.

When Matei visited her ill mother in Romania, she found the same problem as in Australia, with children living on the streets of cities. She spent some time in Europe and returned to Australia, still thinking about the homeless children of Romania. In 1998, Matei and her son returned to Pitești and began working on behalf of homeless children.

In 1999, Matei was confronted with human trafficking for the first time when local police officers contacted her, asking her to bring some clothes for prostitutes they had arrested. Matei brought food and clothes for the girls, only to realize they were all underage and forced to be prostitutes. Matei became enraged as the police officers refused to acknowledge that three girls were underage victims of human trafficking. 

Matei registered her new non-governmental organization, "Reaching Out", opened her shelter, "The House of Treasure," and has been fighting sex slavery since its creation.

References

Living people
Romanian activists
Romanian women activists
Anti–human trafficking activists
Year of birth missing (living people)